

Complement constructions 
As the following example shows, Amoy complement constructions roughly parallel Mandarin, with some exceptions (in red).

back to main article
view chart in simplified Chinese script

Southern Min